Lavandula multifida, the fernleaf lavender or Egyptian lavender, is a small plant, sometimes a shrub, native to the southern regions of the Mediterranean, including Iberia, Sicily, Northwest Africa and the Canary Islands.

The stems are grey and woolly. Leaves are double pinnate. Dark blue or blue violet flowers are borne on long stems held above the foliage.

It is grown both as a herb and as an ornamental plant. In cooler latitudes it is killed by winter frost, but can be grown as an annual. Cultivars include 'Spanish Eyes'.

References

External links
Mediterranean Plants Identification and Distribution from the  University of Reading
University of Oklahoma Department of Botany & Microbiology
The University of Reading

multifida
Flora of the Canary Islands
Flora of Spain
Flora of Sicily
Garden plants of Europe
Drought-tolerant plants
Plants described in 1753
Taxa named by Carl Linnaeus
Flora of the Mediterranean Basin